, born  October 30, 1981 and known professionally as , is a Japanese actress and former singer. From 1998 to 2008, Nagate was part of Hello! Project as a member of the Japan-based girl group Coconuts Musume.

History 
Nagate joined Hello! Having lived most of her teenage years in Hawaii and attending English schools in Japan, Nagate is fluent in both Japanese and English. She is best known by foreign fans for her "Ayaka no Totsugeki Eikaiwa" (Ayaka's Surprise English Lessons) TV segment, where she would test the English skills of Morning Musume members.

On April 30, 2008, Nagate left from Coconuts Musume and Hello! Project to pursue acting. The following day, it was revealed that she had signed with Tristone Entertainment, going under the stage name of Ayaka Nagate.

Personal life
On July 14, 2008, it was announced that she and professional golfer Hideto Tanihara had married.

Photobooks 
 September 5, 2003 –

References

External links 
 Ayaka's Official Blog

1981 births
Coconuts Musume members
Petitmoni members
11Water members
Japanese television personalities
Japanese actresses
People from Kobe
People from Hawaii
Living people
Musicians from Kobe